The Michigan Wetland Management District consists of a 14-county area and includes three waterfowl production areas (WPAs): the  Schlee WPA and the  Mahan WPA in Jackson County and the  Kinney WPA in Van Buren County. The Michigan Department of Natural Resources, Wildlife Division, oversees day-to-day management of these three areas through a partnership with the U.S. Fish and Wildlife Service.

Michigan has a fourth WPA, the  Schoonover WPA, in Lenawee County. Staff of the Ottawa National Wildlife Refuge, located east of Toledo, Ohio, manages this WPA. All four sites are managed as a mixture of wetlands and grasslands to provide high-quality nesting and brood-rearing habitat for waterfowl and a variety of migratory songbirds.

References

External links

 Michigan Wetland Management District

National Wildlife Refuges in Michigan
Protected areas of Jackson County, Michigan
Protected areas of Van Buren County, Michigan
Protected areas of Lenawee County, Michigan
Wetlands of Michigan
Landforms of Jackson County, Michigan
Landforms of Van Buren County, Michigan
Landforms of Lenawee County, Michigan